Severin Eskeland (31 March 1880 – 18 July 1964) was a Norwegian educator, biographer and elected official.

Biography
Eskeland was born at Stord in Hordaland, Norway.  He was the son of Øystein Larsson Eskeland (1840–1933) and Mari Larsdotter Vatna (1844–1932).  He was the brother of Lars Eskeland.

He received a degree from  Hans Nielsen Hauges Minde in Kristiania (now Oslo) during 1903. From 1903 to 1905, he studied at the University of Kristiania (now University of Oslo), but did not take the final exam. He also conducted study trips to Germany, Switzerland and France.

From 1903 to 1950 he was employed in the field of education. He worked at schools in Oslo, Kristiansand, Notodden and Levanger until 1917.  He was Rector at the  Stord Teachers College  (Stord Lærarhøgskule) from 1917 to 1950. He wrote textbooks on history, physics and Old Norse. Additionally he wrote biographies on Rasmus Løland, Thomas von Westen, Vladimir Lenin and Thomas More. He also served as mayor of Stord  from 1935 to 1942.

In 1908, he married Olga Dorothea Olsen (1886–1975) and was the father of Ivar Eskeland.

Selected works
Soga um Eirik Raude: gamalnorsk grunntekst og nynorsk umsetjing, 1907
Lærebok i gamalnorsk (with Knut Liestøl), 1910
Lesebok for ungdomsskulen (with Lars Eskeland), 1912
Soga um millomalderen og den nye tidi, 1926
Kvar skal teiknet stå?, 1943
Kongens tenar – men Guds fyrst. Soga um Thomas More, 1944

References

External links
 

1880 births
1964 deaths
People from Stord
University of Oslo alumni
Heads of schools in Norway
Rectors of universities and colleges in Norway
Norwegian biographers
Norwegian male writers
Male biographers
Norwegian textbook writers
Mayors of places in Hordaland